From List of National Natural Landmarks, these are the eight National Natural Landmarks in Connecticut.  They represent the geological and ecological history of Connecticut, including glacial features such as bogs, old growth forests and swamps.  There are also well preserved dinosaur tracks,

See also
List of National Historic Landmarks in Connecticut

External links
 National Natural Landmarks in Connecticut

Connecticut
National Natural Landmarks